The Tongfosi Formation is a Late Cretaceous (Cenomanian) geologic formation of the Yanji Group in China. Fossil ornithopod tracks of iguanodontids and theropods have been reported from the fluvial sandstones of the formation.

See also 
 List of dinosaur-bearing rock formations
 List of stratigraphic units with ornithischian tracks
 Ornithopod tracks

References

Bibliography 
  
 

Geologic formations of China
Upper Cretaceous Series of Asia
Cretaceous China
Cenomanian Stage
Sandstone formations
Fluvial deposits
Ichnofossiliferous formations
Paleontology in China